Mora is a city in the U.S. state of Minnesota and the county seat of Kanabec County. It is located at the junction of Minnesota highways 23 and 65. The population was 3,571 at the 2010 census.

History
Mora was platted in 1882 by Myron Kent. The city was named after Mora, Sweden. when Israel Israelson suggested the name of his hometown in Dalarna County, Sweden. The post office  has been in operation at Mora since 1883 with Myron Kent being the first post master of Mora.

Geography 

Mora is located 72 miles north of Minneapolis-St. Paul at the intersection of Minnesota highways 23 and 65. It is also 52 miles northeast of St. Cloud and 91 miles southwest of Duluth.

Mora is along the Snake River.

Climate

Demographics

2010 census
As of the census of 2010, there were 3,571 people, 1,513 households, and 857 families living in the city. The racial makeup of the city was 98.4% White, 0.2% African American, 0.3% Native American 0.3% from other races, and 0.9% from two or more races. Hispanic or Latino of any race were 2.2% of the population.

There were 1,513 households, of which 28.1% had children under the age of 18 living with them, 37.6% were married couples living together, 13.4% had a female householder with no husband present, 5.6% had a male householder with no wife present, and 43.4% were non-families. 37.8% of all households were made up of individuals, and 20.3% had someone living alone who was 65 years of age or older. The average household size was 2.21 and the average family size was 2.87.

The median age in the city was 39.6 years. 23.4% of residents were under the age of 18; 8.4% were between the ages of 18 and 24; 23% were from 25 to 44; 23.3% were from 45 to 64; and 21.8% were 65 years of age or older. The gender makeup of the city was 47.2% male and 52.8% female.

2000 census
As of the census of 2000, there were 3,139 people, 1,381 households, and 814 families living in the city. The population density in the year 2000 was 781.2 per square mile (301.4/km). The racial makeup of the city was 96.71% White, 0.28% African American, 1.28% Native American, 0.19% Asian, 0.03% Pacific Islander, 0.25% from other races, and 1.25% from two or more races. 1.57% of the population were Hispanic or Latino of any race.

There were 1,381 households, out of which 29.2% had children under the age of 18 living with them, 43.2% were married couples living together, 11.8% had a female householder with no husband present, and 41.0% were non-families. 36.9% of all households were made up of individuals, and 21.2% had someone living alone who was 65 years of age or older. The average household size was 2.23 and the average family size was 2.89.

In the city, the population was spread out, with 24.3% under the age of 18, 8.2% from 18 to 24, 24.3% from 25 to 44, 19.9% from 45 to 64, and 23.3% who were 65 years of age or older. The median age was 40 years. For every 100 females, there were 84.6 males. For every 100 females age 18 and over, there were 80.7 males.

The median income for a household in the city was $30,566, and the median income for a family was $40,577. Males had a median income of $32,222 versus $21,797 for females. The per capita income for the city was $17,949. 9.0% of the population and 6.0% of families were below the poverty line. Out of the total population, 7.7% of those under the age of 18 and 10.1% of those 65 and older were living below the poverty line.

Infrastructure

Transportation
Mora is served by the Mora Municipal Airport.

Major highways
The following routes are located within the city of Mora.

  Minnesota State Highway 23
  Minnesota State Highway 65
The following county roads also serve as important routes in the city of Mora.

  Kanabec County Road 1
  Kanabec County Road 6
  Kanabec County Road 27

Arts and culture

Mora is the home of a gigantic Dala horse, and a Mora clock commemorating the town's Swedish roots. Mora's sister city and namesake is Mora, Sweden, known for being the ending point of the Swedish Vasaloppet. They became sister cities in 1972 when the Dala horse was dedicated.

The city of Mora also plays host each February to the Vasaloppet USA, the largest cross-country skiing event in Minnesota, as well as the Snake River Canoe Race, the Mora Half-Marathon, and the Mora Bicycle Tour.

Notable people
Roger Crawford, state representative
Dan Stevens, state senator
Bill Diessner, state senator and physician
Alice Frost, actress
Henry Rines, Minnesota state treasurer and speaker of the Minnesota House of Representatives
Judy Soderstrom, state representative and businesswoman

References

External links

City of Mora – Official Website
dala.mn – Mora's community portal
 Mora, Sweden, about Mora Minnesota

Cities in Minnesota
County seats in Minnesota
Cities in Kanabec County, Minnesota
1882 establishments in Minnesota
Populated places established in 1882